Lili is a 1953 American film released by MGM. It stars Leslie Caron as a touchingly naïve French girl whose emotional relationship with a carnival puppeteer is conducted through the medium of four puppets. The film won the Academy Award for Best Original Score, and was also entered in the 1953 Cannes Film Festival. It was later adapted for the stage under the title Carnival! (1961).

Lili's screenplay, written by Helen Deutsch, was based on a short story and treatment titled "The Seven Souls of Clement O'Reilly" written by Paul Gallico, which in turn was based upon "The Man Who Hated People," a short story by Gallico that appeared in the October 28, 1950 issue of The Saturday Evening Post. After the film's success, Gallico expanded his story into a 1954 novella entitled Love of Seven Dolls.

Plot

Naive country girl Lili (Leslie Caron) arrives in a provincial town in hopes of locating an old friend of her late father, only to find that he has died. A local shopkeeper offers her employment, then tries to take advantage of her. She is rescued by a handsome, smooth-talking, womanizing carnival magician, Marc, whose stage name is Marcus the Magnificent (Jean-Pierre Aumont). Lili is infatuated with him and follows him to the carnival, where on learning that she is 16, he helps her get a job as waitress. Lili is fired on her first night when she spends her time watching the magic act instead of waiting tables. When Lili consults the magician for advice, he tells her to go back to where she came from. Homeless and heartbroken, she contemplates suicide, unaware that she is being watched by the carnival's puppeteer Paul (Mel Ferrer). He strikes up a conversation with her through his puppets—a brash red-haired boy named Carrot Top, a sly fox, Reynardo, a vain ballerina, Marguerite, and a cowardly giant, Golo. Soon, a large group of carnival workers is enthralled watching Lili's interaction with the puppets, as she is seemingly unaware that there is a puppeteer behind the curtain. Afterwards, Paul and his partner Jacquot (Kurt Kasznar) offer Lili a job in the act, talking with the puppets. She accepts, and her natural manner of interacting with the puppets becomes the most valuable part of the act.

Paul was once a well-known dancer, but suffered a leg injury in World War II. He regards the puppet show as far inferior to his old career, which embitters him. Lili refers to him as "the Angry Man". Although he falls in love with Lili, he can only express his feelings through the puppets. Fearing rejection due to his physical impairment, he keeps his distance by being unpleasant to her. Lili continues to dream about the handsome magician, wishing to replace his assistant Rosalie (Zsa Zsa Gabor).

Soon, Marcus receives an offer to perform at the local casino and decides to leave the carnival, to the joy of Rosalie, who announces to everyone that she is his wife. Lili is heartbroken and innocently invites Marc to her trailer.  His lecherous plans are interrupted by Paul, and he leaves. When Lili finds Marc's wedding ring in the seat cushions and tries to chase him, Paul stops her, calls her a fool, and slaps her.

Two impresarios from Paris who have been scouting the show come to see Paul and Jacquot. They  recognize Paul as the former dancer and tell him that his act with Lili and the puppets is ingenious. Paul is ecstatic about this and the offer, but Jacquot tells the agents that they will have to let them know. He then tells Paul that Lili is leaving.

Lili takes the wedding ring to Marc and tells him that every little girl has to wake up from her girlish dreams. She has decided to leave the carnival. On her way out, she is stopped by the voices of Carrot Top and Reynardo, who ask her to take them with her. As they embrace her, she finds they are shaking. She remembers somebody is behind the curtain and pulls it away to see Paul. Instead of telling her how he feels, he tells her of the agents' offer. She confronts him about the difference between his real self, seemingly incapable of love, and his puppets. He tells her he is the puppets, a creature of many facets and many flaws. He concludes by telling her, "This is business."  "Not any more," retorts Lili, who walks away.

Walking out of town, she imagines that the puppets, now life-sized, have joined her. As she dances with each puppet in turn, they all turn into Paul. Coming back to reality, Lili runs back to the carnival and into Paul's arms. They kiss passionately as the puppets applaud.

Cast
 Leslie Caron – Lili Daurier 
 Mel Ferrer – Paul Berthalet 
 Jean-Pierre Aumont – Marc 
 Zsa Zsa Gabor – Rosalie 
 Kurt Kasznar – Jacquot 
 Amanda Blake – Peach Lips 
 Alex Gerry – Proprietor 
 Ralph Dumke – Mr. Corvier 
 Wilton Graff – Mr. Tonit
 George Baxter – Mr. Enrique

Production

Puppets
Walton and O'Rourke, famous in puppeteering circles, made the puppets. They mostly worked in cabarets and did not appear on television. Lili is among the few known filmed records of their work which also includes the Walter Lantz cartoon and live action short film, Oswald the Lucky Rabbit: Puppet Show (1936).

Walton and O'Rourke manipulated Marguerite and Reynardo, George Latshaw was responsible for Carrot Top, and Wolo Von Trutzschler handled Golo the Giant. Burr Tillstrom was approached to create puppets for the film, but turned it down.

Music
The score was composed by Bronisław Kaper and conducted by Hans Sommer, with orchestrations by Robert Franklyn and Skip Martin.  Kaper's music received the Oscar for "Best Music, Scoring of a Dramatic or Comedy Picture."

Lyrics for the song "Hi-Lili, Hi-Lo" were written by Helen Deutsch for her previously published short story "Song of Love". Kaper's setting of the song was performed by Caron and Mel Ferrer in the film; the performance was released on record and reached number 30 in the American charts.

Four excerpts from the score were first issued by MGM Records at the time of the film's release.  The complete score was issued on CD in 2005, on Film Score Monthly records.

Responses and box-office
The New York Times included it in its 2004 Guide to the Best 1,000 Movies Ever Made, as did Angie Errigo and Jo Berry in a 2005 compilation of Chick Flicks: Movies Women Love.

Bosley Crowther, reviewing the film at its opening, had nothing but praise for the movie, rejoicing that "at last Leslie Caron's simplicity and freshness...have been captured again in the film." He showered other encomia on Caron, calling her "elfin", "winsome", the "focus of warmth and appeal", praising her "charm, grace, beauty, and vitality." He said screenwriter Helen Deutsch had "put together a frankly fanciful romance with clarity, humor, and lack of guile," and admires the choreographer, sets, music, and title song.

The film was not universally liked, though; Pauline Kael called it a "sickly whimsy" and referred to Mel Ferrer's "narcissistic, masochistic smiles."

According to MGM records, the film earned $2,210,000 in the U.S. and Canada and $3,183,000 overseas, resulting in a profit of $1,878,000, making it MGM's most popular musical of the year.

Awards and nominations

Source text and sequel

The Man Who Hated People (short story)
The Man Who Hated People appeared in the October 28, 1950 issue of The Saturday Evening Post. It is lighter in tone than other versions of the story. In particular, the abuse heaped by the puppeteer on the innocent "girl" is emotional and verbal. Unlike the novel The Love of Seven Dolls, the short story does not even hint at physical or sexual abuse.

The story opens in a New York City television studio where Milly, a "sweet-faced girl with [a] slightly harassed expression," is about to make her farewell appearance on the Peter and Panda show.

Peter and Panda are part of an ensemble of puppets; they are a leprechaun and a panda respectively; other puppets include Arthur, a "raffish crocodile;" Mme Robineau, a French lady "of indeterminate age with dyed hair;" Doctor Henderson, a penguin; and Mr Tootenheimer, a toymaker. They are all operated by a single puppeteer, named Crake Villeridge. Despite being a puppet show, it has, like the real-life Kukla, Fran and Ollie TV show, a huge audience of all ages. Also like Kukla, Fran and Ollie, there is no script: "it's all ad-libbed". (In fact, the illustration included with the story features the actual stage used for Kukla, Fran and Ollie.) At the end of the show, "millions watching felt a sense of loss as though a family close to them were breaking up."

Milly has been with the show two years, and, as in other versions of the story, she interacts in a spontaneous and endearing way directly with the personae of the puppets. In a flashback,  during her audition, she had met and talked to the puppets before meeting any human being. Not realizing that this encounter was her audition, she is surprised when a station representative meets her and tells her "Your performance this afternoon came closest to what [Mr Villeridge] wants." She says "But it actually wasn't a performance", and is told "Exactly. The first time you start giving a performance, you're through."

Villeridge, we learn, is French Canadian, and had once been headed for a serious career as a hockey player. In an accident, two men "skated over the side of his face," ending his hockey career, and seriously and permanently disfiguring him.

She soon learns that Villeridge is emotionally an abuser. She loves the on-air performances, loves the puppets and their personalities, and finds Mr Tootenheimer, the wise old toymaker, particularly comforting, but she hates Villeridge and what he does to her in rehearsal and after the show. He shouts at her, demeans her, criticizes everything she has done, and humiliates her in front of the program staff. When she meets a nice man named Fred Archer and believes she is "a little in love" with him, she decides she can no longer stand Villeridge and his tyrannical ways. She announces that she is marrying Archer and gives notice.

After her farewell show, she changes into her street dress. She waits for everyone else to leave the studio, afraid of encountering Villeridge, who "might be waiting for her with one last attack." As she leaves, she hears the voice of Arthur, the puppet, who says, "I stayed behind. Milly, take me with you." Soon she is talking to Arthur and the other puppets. Mr Tootenheimer, the "old philosopher", explains to her that every man is composed of many things, and that the puppets represent aspects of Villeridge's real personality:

And if a man who has been cut and scarred and is ashamed of his appearance, who loved you from the first time his eyes rested upon your face, could be a brutal fool, believing that if you could be made to love all of the things he really was, you would never again recoil from the things he seemed to be.

Millie cries "Crake! Crake! come to me." They embrace, and Milly decides to say goodbye to "the outside world—reality—Fred Archer" and live with Villeridge and his created "Never-Never Land of the mind."

Love of Seven Dolls
"In Paris in the spring of our times, a young girl was about to throw herself into the Seine."  Thus opens the novella from which the film Lili and the musical Carnival was drawn.

The Paul Gallico short story from which Lili was adapted was published in expanded form in 1954 as Love of Seven Dolls, a 125-page novella. The New York Times review of the book opens "Those audiences still making their way to see Lili may now read the book from which this motion picture was adapted." The original short story was clearly based on the popular television puppet show Kukla, Fran and Ollie, as it takes place in a television studio (not a carnival as in the film and book), and has many characters based on the Kuklapolitans. The novella was far more mystical and magic than the short story. Brettonais from the village of Plouha..."Wretched though she was, some of the mystery of that mysterious land still clung to her...the gravity of her glance, the innocence and primitive mind...there were dark corners of Celtic brooding...a little scarecrow."

Helen Deutsch's adaptation is [somewhat] true to the essential core of Gallico's story, but there are many differences, and Gallico's book is far, far darker in tone. In the book, the girl's nickname is Mouche ("fly") rather than Lili.  The puppeteer is named Michel Peyrot, stage name Capitaine Coq, rather than Paul Berthalet. He is not a crippled dancer; rather, "he was bred out of the gutters of Paris", yet something moves him to save the potential suicide.

The puppeteer's assistant is a "primitive" Senegalese man named Golo, rather than the movie's amiable Frenchman, Jacquot. He shares with Mouche a sense of primitive magic, and with her believes in the reality of the puppets.

The first four puppets she meets correspond closely to those in the film and are a youth named Carrot Top; a fox, Reynardo; a vain girl, Gigi; and a "huge, tousle-headed, hideous, yet pathetic-looking giant" Alifanfaron. The latter two are named "Marguerite" and "Golo" in the movie (i.e. the name of the puppeteer's assistant in the book becomes the name of a puppet in the movie). The book includes three additional puppets: a penguin named Dr. Duclos who wears a pince-nez and is a dignified academic; Madame Muscat, "the concierge", who constantly warns Mouche that the others are "a bad lot"; and Monsieur Nicholas, a man with steel-rimmed spectacles, stocking cap, and leather apron, who is "a maker and mender of toys."

The core of both book and movie is the childlike innocence of Mouche/Lili and her simple conviction that she is interacting directly with the puppets themselves, which have some kind of existence separate from the puppeteer. This separation is perfectly explicit in the book. It says that Golo was "childlike...but in the primitive fashion backed by the dark lore of his race" and looked upon the puppets "as living, breathing creatures", but "the belief in the separate existence of these little people was even more basic with Mouche for it was a necessity to her and a refuge from the storms of life with which she had been unable to cope."

In the movie, the puppeteer, Paul Berthalet, is gruff, unhappy, and emotionally distant. Although Lili refers to him as "the Angry Man", he is not very cruel or menacing. His bitterness is explained by his identity as a former ballet dancer, disabled by a leg injury and "reduced" to the role of puppeteer.

Gallico's Peyrot, however, is vicious in every sense of the word. No ballet dancer, he was "bred out of the gutters" and by the age of 15 was "a little savage practiced in all the cruel arts and swindles of the street fairs and cheap carnivals." He has "the look of a satyr." "Throughout his life no one had ever been kind to him, or gentle, and he paid back the world in like. Wholly cynical, he had no regard for man, woman, child, or God ... He would, if he could, have corrupted the whole world."

In both book and movie, Mouche/Lili is tempted by a superficial attraction to a handsome man—an acrobat named Balotte in the book, the magician Marc in the movie—but returns to the puppeteer. In the movie, Marc's relation with Lili is exploitative. In the book, however, Peyrot is the exploitative and abusive one, and the relationship with BalottMouche "passed in that moment over the last threshold from child to womanhood" and knew "the catalyst that could save him. It was herself." She tells Peyrot "Michel...I love you. I will never leave you." Peyrot does not respond, but he weeps; Mouche holds his "transfigured" head and, according to Gallico, "knew that they were the tears of a man...who, emerging from the long nightmare, would be made forever whole by love." If this is a happy ending, it is not the simple happy ending of the movie.

Reviewing the book on its publication, Andrea Parke says that Gallico creates "magic...when he writes the sequences with Mouche and the puppets." But "when he writes the love story of Mouche as the ill-treated plaything of the puppet master, the story loses its magic. The mawkish realism of the passages has an aura of bathos that is not only unreal but unmoving."

Legacy
The film is recognized by American Film Institute in these lists:
 2004: AFI's 100 Years...100 Songs:	
 "Hi-Lili, Hi-Lo"—Nominated

References

External links

 
 
 
 
 
 Various releases on LP and cd of the music from the film

1953 films
American musical films
Circus films
Films about orphans
Films directed by Charles Walters
Metro-Goldwyn-Mayer films
1953 musical films
Films that won the Best Original Score Academy Award
Films adapted into plays
Films based on works by Paul Gallico
Films set in amusement parks
Films set in France
Puppet films
Films scored by Bronisław Kaper
1950s English-language films
1950s American films